Almora Lok Sabha constituency is one of the five Lok Sabha (parliamentary) constituencies in Uttarakhand. This constituency came into existence in 1952, following the delimitation of Lok Sabha constituencies. It comprises four districts namely Almora, Bageshwar, Champawat and Pithoragarh. Since 2009, this constituency is reserved for the Scheduled Caste candidates.

Assembly segments

After the formation of Uttarakhand

At present, Almora Lok Sabha constituency comprises the following fourteen Vidhan Sabha (legislative assembly) constituency segments of Uttarakhand:

Before the formation of Uttarakhand

Almora Lok Sabha constituency comprised the following five Vidhan Sabha (legislative assembly) constituency segments of Uttar Pradesh:

Members of Parliament

Election results

General Elections, 2019

General Elections, 2014

General Elections, 2009

General Elections, 2004

See also
 List of constituencies of the Lok Sabha
 List of parliamentary constituencies in Uttarakhand

References

External links
Almora lok sabha  constituency election 2019 date and schedule

Lok Sabha constituencies in Uttarakhand